Herman Rapp was a German-American soccer defender who was a member of the U.S. national team at the 1934 FIFA World Cup. He was born in Stuttgart, Germany. His dates of birth and death are unknown.

In 1928, Rapp is listed with F.C. Schwaben of the International Soccer Football League of Chicago.  He was then listed with the Philadelphia German-Americans of the American Soccer League during the World Cup. 

In 1934, Rapp was called into the U.S. team for the 1934 FIFA World Cup.  However, he did not enter the lone U.S game of the tournament, a 7-1 loss to eventual champion Italy.

Coaching
In 1938, Rapp was the head coach of the Schwaben.  By then Schwaben competed in the National Soccer League of Chicago.

External links
 History of Chicago Schwaben

Footballers from Stuttgart
German emigrants to the United States
American soccer players
Chicago Schwaben players
American Soccer League (1933–1983) players
Uhrik Truckers players
1934 FIFA World Cup players
Year of birth missing
Year of death missing
Association football defenders
German footballers